Amir Abdullahi, formally Abd Allah II ibn 'Ali 'Abd ash-Shakur or Amir Hajji 'Abdu'llahi II ibn 'Ali 'Abdu's Shakur ( – 1930), was the last amir of Harar and ruled from  late 1884 to 26 January 1887, when the state was terminated, following the defeat of the Harari troops at the Battle of Chelenqo on 9 January. 

According to R. A. Caulk, Amir Abdullahi was the son of Muhammad ibn `Ali `Abd ash-Shakur by Kadija, the daughter of Emir `Abd al-Karim ibn Muhammad. To secure his hold on the emirate of Harar, his father had married Abdullahi to the daughter of Ahmad III ibn Abu Bakr, his predecessor. Abdullahi was a student of and a Islamic fundamentalist.

Egypt had occupied Harar since 1875, but the local commander reported that maintaining that occupation was costly and logistically challenging, so the Egyptians withdrew leaving Amir Abdullahi with the Khedive's firman to rule Harar. He was given "a few hundred soldiers trained by one of the British officers, 300 to 400 rifles, some cannon, and munitions, a force hardly sufficient to garrison Harar and Jaldessa, let alone police the trade routes and ensure the security of the state." During his brief tenure Abdullahi expanded the Jami Mosque.

Amir Abdullahi grew anxious about the growing Ethiopian threat to his domain, and accused the resident Europeans of co-operating with Menelik II. His situation had deteriorated by July 1885, according to historian Harold Marcus, with a population that had grown "uncontrollable, European traders [who] became virtual prisoners in their homes and shops, and the adjacent Oromos [who] raided the town." In response, the Amir introduced a new currency which impoverished the local population. The neighboring Oromo and Somali deserted Harar's markets and the town's economy collapsed. Amir Abdullahi ordered all non-citizens in the town to either convert to Islam or leave. 

Hearing of an Italian trade mission headed to Harar, he ordered troops to intercept them and to turn them back or kill them. The Italians were killed at Jildessa. This gave Menelik II a casus belli, based on protecting trade, with the added impetus to foreclose Italian takeover of the city. In late 1886 Menelik II moved troops toward Harar.

The ughaz (malakh) of the Somali Gadabuursi, Ughaz Nur II, had established strong relations with Amir Abdullahi, and in December 1886, when Harar was threatened by Menelik II, Ughaz Nur sent Gadabuursi askaris to support Amir Abdullahi.

Amir Abdullahi responded to the first Ethiopian military probe with a night attack on their camp at Hirna that included fireworks; the Ethiopians panicked at the pyrotechnics and fled toward the Asabot and Awash Rivers. When the Negus Menelik personally led a second attack a few months later, the Amir misjudged the quality of these troops and attempted to repeat his earlier success with a second night attack. "Had he allowed the enemy to attack the walled city, where his few Krupp cannon might have been effective, the Shoans might have suffered a defeat with serious political consequences," Marcus notes. However, the Battle of Chelenqo (Chalanqo) destroyed the Amir's army, the Amir fled, with his wives and children, into the desert country east of Harar. He left his uncle Ali Abu Barka to submit to Menelik and ask clemency for the people of Harar.

Abdullahi later returned to Harar to live as a Sufi religious scholar. He died there in 1930.

See also 
 List of emirs of Harar

Notes and references

Year of birth missing
1930 deaths
Emirs of Harar